Power density is the amount of power (time rate of energy transfer) per unit volume.

In energy transformers including batteries, fuel cells, motors, power supply units etc., power density refers to a volume, where it is often called volume power density, expressed as W/m3.

In reciprocating internal combustion engines, power density (power per swept volume or brake horsepower per cubic centimeter) is an important metric, based on the internal capacity of the engine, not its external size.

Examples

See also
Surface power density, energy per unit of area
Energy density, energy per unit volume
 Specific energy, energy per unit mass
Power-to-weight ratio/specific power, power per unit mass
Specific absorption rate (SAR)

References

Power (physics)